Julio Mario Santo Domingo Pumarejo (October 16, 1923 – October 7, 2011) was a Colombian-American billionaire businessman, diplomat and patriarch of the Santo Domingo family who lived in New York City. He controlled more than 100 companies in the diversified portfolio of the "Santo Domingo Group." He was listed by Forbes magazine as one of the wealthiest men in the world, and the second-wealthiest in Colombia, with a fortune of US$8 billion. He was the founder of a philanthropic foundation, named to honor his father, that benefits Colombia's social development.

Early life
Julio Mario Santo Domingo was born on October 16, 1923 in Panama City, Panama, to Julio Mario Santo Domingo and Beatriz Pumarejo de Vengoechea, the youngest of their four children; his older siblings were Beatriz Alicia, Cecilia, and Luis Felipe. His father was a banker, described as austere and disciplined, who made a fortune buying companies weakened during the Great Depression; his mother, from a rich and influential family, was first cousin of Alfonso López Pumarejo who was twice President of Colombia. He grew up in Barranquilla and later attended the exclusive Gimnasio Moderno in Bogotá, D.C., ultimately culminating his secondary studies at the Phillips Academy in Andover, Massachusetts; he later attended University of Virginia before transferring to Georgetown University, but did not finish his degree.

Ambassadorship
On May 26, 1980, President Julio César Turbay Ayala appointed Santo Domingo to be the first Ambassador of Colombia to China. He presented his Letters of Credence to Ulanhu, Vice Chairman of the Standing Committee of the National People's Congress, in Beijing on February 17, 1981.

Santo Domingo Group
The Group has a majority stake in Bavaria Brewery and Valores Bavaria (a holding company for his non-beer interests). In 2005, Bavaria Brewery merged with South African company SABMiller. In this merging, the group acquired 15.1% of SAB Miller, becoming the second-largest shareholder of the second-largest beer company in the world (behind Anheuser-Busch InBev).

Portfolio
 Caracol TV (Colombian television channel)
 Caracol TV International
 Caracol Radio (sold to PRISA in 2001)
 Cromos (magazine)
 El Espectador (newspaper)
 SABMiller (14% stake)
 Avianca (sold in 2004 to Germán Efromovich)
 Bluradio (radio station)

Personal life
He first married to Edyala Braga Brandão do Monte, a Brazilian socialite, daughter of Brazilian ambassador in Paris and former wife of Brazilian President Getúlio Vargas' brother. Together they had one son, Julio Mario Santo Domingo Braga (1958–2009), but the marriage did not last long and they divorced shortly after. Julio Mario Jr. married Vera Rechulski, a Brazilian socialite and they had 2 children – Tatiana Santo Domingo (born November 24, 1983) and Julio Mario Santo Domingo III (born May 2, 1985).

He remarried on February 15, 1975 to Colombian socialite Beatrice Dávila Rocha, and together they had two sons, Alejandro Santo Domingo Dávila (b. 1977) who has continued on in the family business and Andrés Santo Domingo Dávila (b. 1978) the co-founder and president of Kemado Records, who in 2008 married socialite Lauren Davis (then founder of the online fashion retailer Moda Operandi).

Santo Domingo owned homes in New York City, in Paris, and Barú, a Colombian island near Cartagena.

References

Further reading

External links
 Forbes.com: Forbes: World's Richest People
 Latin Business Chronicle: Latin America's Billionaires
 The Death of Julio Mario Santo Domingo
 Caracol Televisión special coverage on Julio Mario Santo Domingo
 Julio Mario Santo Domingo P. (1923–2011) 
 Julio Mario Santo Domingo on images

1923 births
2011 deaths
People from Panama City
Julio Mario

Colombian expatriates in Panama
Colombian emigrants to the United States
University of Virginia alumni
Colombian billionaires
20th-century Colombian businesspeople
Colombian chief executives
Colombian philanthropists
Businesspeople in brewing
Ambassadors of Colombia to China
20th-century American businesspeople
21st-century businesspeople
20th-century philanthropists